Israeli League is the top level ice hockey league of Israel.

History
In 2017-2018, for the first time in the league's history, there were 3 senior divisions (A, B, C) with a total of 29 senior teams playing. The Haifa Hawks have won the most league titles, with six.

Teams

Top division (Senior A) teams

National division (Senior B) teams

Amateur division (Senior C) teams

Amateur division (Senior C North) teams

Champions

Titles by team

See also
 Ice hockey in Israel
 Israel national ice hockey team
 Ice Hockey Federation of Israel
 Israel men's national junior ice hockey team

References

External links
 Ice Hockey Federation of Israel
 Hockeyarenas.net

 
Sports_leagues_in_Israel
Top tier ice hockey leagues in Europe
Professional ice hockey leagues in Israel